Mark Kramer (born 1958), known as Kramer, is a musician, composer, record producer and founder of Shimmy-Disc.

Mark Kramer may also refer to:

 Mark Kramer (journalist) (fl. from 1969), American journalist, author, professor, and editor
 Mark Kramer (jazz pianist) (born 1945), American jazz pianist, composer, arranger, and producer/engineer

See also
 Marc Kramer, American entrepreneur, author and journalist